Arda Vekiloğlu (born 21 January 1979, in Turkey) is a Turkish professional basketball coach and former player. He was recently head coach for Petkim Spor of the TBL. He was a part of the Turkey national basketball team. 

In August 2018, he signed to become the head coach of Bursaspor Basketbol.

On July 2, 2019, he has signed with Petkim Spor of the TBL.

Career
Player:
 Pınar Karşıyaka (1995–1999, 2005–2006)
 Efes Pilsen (1999–2000, 2001–2002)
 Galatasaray Café Crown (2000–2001, 2002–2003, 2004–2005)
 Ülkerspor (2003–2004)
 Beşiktaş Cola Turka (2006–2007)
 Kepez Belediyesi (2007–2008)

Coach:
 Gelişim Koleji (Youth Team)
 Bursaspor (Head Coach)
 Petkim Spor (Head Coach)
 Balıkesir Büyükşehir Belediyespor (Head Coach)

References

External links
TBLStat.net Profile

1979 births
Living people
Anadolu Efes S.K. players
Beşiktaş men's basketball players
Forwards (basketball)
Galatasaray S.K. (men's basketball) players
Karşıyaka basketball players
Kepez Belediyesi S.K. players
Turkish men's basketball players
Ülker G.S.K. basketball players